In the 2013 rugby league season, the English club Widnes Vikings won 6 of their matches in the Super League, drew 2 and lost 12.

Pre-season friendlies

Super League

References

Widnes Vikings seasons
2013 in rugby league by club